Xu Jiajun (born 29 May 1995) is a Chinese footballer currently playing as a midfielder or defender for Qingdao Hainiu.

Club career
Xu started his professional football career in June 2016 when he was loaned to China League Two side Shenyang Urban from Hebei China Fortune. He moved aboard to Belgian First Division B side Roeselare along with Wang Bin in July 2017. On 27 October 2017, he made his debut for the club in a 5–0 away defeat against Beerschot Wilrijk, coming on as a substitute for Davy Brouwers in the 79th minute.

In July 2018, Xu transferred to Super League side Beijing Renhe, he was loaned to Yanbian Beiguo for the rest of the season. On 11 February 2019, Xu transferred to League Two newcomer Taizhou Yuanda. He would go on to establish himself as a vital player and help the club gain promotion to the second tier at the end of the 2019 China League Two campaign. After two seasons with the team the club would dissolve and he would join third tier club Qingdao Hainiu. He would go on to play a vital part as the club won the third tier title and promotion at the end of the 2021 China League Two season. He would go on to achieve successive promotions as he helped guide the club to second in the 2022 China League One season and promotion back into the top tier.

Career statistics

References

External links
Xu Jiajun at Worldfootball.net

1995 births
Living people
Footballers from Maoming
Chinese footballers
Chinese expatriate footballers
Association football defenders
China League Two players
China League One players
Challenger Pro League players
Hebei F.C. players
Liaoning Shenyang Urban F.C. players
K.S.V. Roeselare players
Taizhou Yuanda F.C. players
Chinese expatriate sportspeople in Belgium
Expatriate footballers in Belgium